The Ulm tramway network is a network of tramways forming part of the public transport system in Ulm, a city in the federal state of Baden-Württemberg, Germany.

Opened in 1897, the network is currently operated by Stadtwerke Ulm/Neu-Ulm GmbH (SWU), and integrated in the Donau-Iller-Nahverkehrsverbund (DING).

Lines 
On December 8th 2018, a second main line was added to the former single tram line that had been left of the former network since 1964.

Rolling stock 

Currently, SWU has ten Combino NGT 6 UL trams and twelve Avenio M NGT 6 UL trams, both types manufactured by Siemens Mobility. All trams use a 1000 mm gauge.

Combino trams 
In 2003, the previous fleet of GT4 trams was replaced with eight Combino NGT 6 UL vehicles. Two more trams were delivered in 2008 to service the extended Line 1.

Fleet Numbers: 
41 – Albrecht Berblinger
42 – Agathe Streicher
43 – Albert Einstein
44 – Max Eyth
45 – Otl Aicher
46 – Johannes Kepler
47 – Jörg Syrlin
48 – Sophie Scholl
49 – Hans Scholl
50 – Resi Weglein

Avenio trams 

For the newly built Line 2, SWU invited tenders for twelve more vehicles.

See also
 List of town tramway systems in Germany
 Trams in Germany

References

External links

 Stadtwerke Ulm/Neu-Ulm GmbH – official site 
 Tram line maps for Ulm
 
 

Ulm
Transport in Ulm
Metre gauge railways in Germany
Ulm